Charles Edward Chubb (17 May 1845 – 27 February 1930) was a judge in the Supreme Court of Queensland, Australia. He was also a Member of the Queensland Legislative Assembly and an Attorney-General of Queensland.

Early life
Chubb was born on 17 May 1845 in London, England. His father was Charles Frederick Chubb, a solicitor, and his mother was Sarah, née Bennett. He had four siblings. When he was 16 he moved to Ipswich, Queensland, and finished his schooling at Ipswich Collegiate School.  He became a solicitor in 1867, after completing his articles with his father.

In 1870 Chubb married Christian Westgarth Macarthur, with whom he had five children. Three survived to adulthood.

Politics
On 5 January 1883, Pope Alexander Cooper, the Attorney-General of Queensland and member for Bowen in the Queensland Legislative Assembly, resigned. Chubb, who had been appointed Attorney-General on 6 January 1883, won the resulting by-election on 18 January 1883. He held the seat until the 1888 election.

Justice
He became a member of the Supreme Court of Queensland on 2 December 1889, serving first at Townsville until 1908, and then at Brisbane. There was animosity between the Labor government and the judges, playing out through a series of cases challenging government actions and legislation. The parliament undermined his security of tenure by passing the Judges Retirement Act 1921 (Qld), the effect of which was that immediately upon proclamation three out of six judges, Chief Justice Cooper and Justices Real and Chubb were compulsorily retired, which permitted the government to appoint new judges.

Later life
Chubb died in Brisbane on 27 February 1930 and his funeral proceeded from St. Malo, his former residence in South Brisbane to the South Brisbane Cemetery.

References

1845 births
1930 deaths
Judges of the Supreme Court of Queensland
Lawyers from London
English emigrants to Australia
Burials in South Brisbane Cemetery
Attorneys-General of Queensland
Colony of Queensland judges
19th-century Australian judges
20th-century Australian judges